Michael F. Walsh (February 24, 1894, Brooklyn, Kings County, New York – July 22, 1956, Brooklyn, New York City) was an American lawyer and Democratic politician. His father, Patrick, who emigrated from Ballydine House near Cashel in Ireland's County Tipperary, was the first person to serve simultaneously as the Chief and Fire Commissioner of the New York City Fire Department.

Life
Michael served in the U.S. Navy during World War I. A graduate of the Law School of Columbia University, he was United States Attorney for the Eastern District of New York from 1938 to 1939 before becoming Secretary of State of New York from 1939 to 1943. He served as a justice of the New York State Supreme Court from 1943 to 1954. For a considerable period, he was a part-time Lecturer at Columbia Law.

He died at his home at 1193 East Nineteenth Street in Brooklyn.

Sources
 Political Graveyard

Politicians from Brooklyn
Secretaries of State of New York (state)
1894 births
1956 deaths
New York Supreme Court Justices
United States Attorneys for the Eastern District of New York
20th-century American judges